John L. Steckley (born March 13, 1949) is a Canadian scholar specializing in Native American studies and the indigenous languages of the Americas. Steckley has a PhD in Education from the University of Toronto. He taught at Humber College in Toronto, Ontario, from 1983 until his retirement in June 2015.

Steckley is one of the last known speakers of the Wyandot language, which he has studied for over thirty years. Today he works closely with the Wyandotte Nation of Oklahoma to aid in language revitalization alongside other Wyandot linguists such as Richard Zane Smith from the unrecognized Wyandot Nation of Kansas and Dr. Craig Kopris. He is also interested in place names as derived from indigenous languages, and aims to correct common misconceptions regarding their original derivations.

Steckley has become a deeply respected figure amongst the Wyandot. On his adoption into the Wyandot tribe in 1999, he was named Tehaondechoren ("he who splits the country in two"). He was also given the name "Hechon" by descendants of the Huron in Loretteville, Quebec City, while teaching them their own historical language. This was a name that had previously been given to Jean de Brébeuf (1593–1649), one of the North American Martyrs, by his Huron and Wyandot followers.

His 2007, Huron-English Dictionary was the first book of its type for over 250 years to be published.

In 2007, Laval University received a federal grant of $1 million for development of its Huron-language teaching materials in collaboration with Steckley.

Steckley has written widely on a variety of sociological and anthropological topics, including a recent book on gibbons.

Bibliography 
 Full Circle: Canada's First Nations (2001)
 Aboriginal Voices and the Politics of Representation in Canadian Introductory Sociology Textbooks (2003)
 A Huron-English / English-Huron Dictionary, Listing Both Nouns and Verb Roots (2007)
 Elements of Sociology: A Critical Canadian Introduction (with Guy Letts) (2008)
 Beyond Their Years: Five Native Women's Stories (2011)
 Learning from the Past: Five Cases of Aboriginal Justice (2013)
 Foundations of Sociology (2014)
 The Eighteenth-Century Wyandot: A Clan-Based Study (2014)
 Gibbons: The Invisible Apes (2015)

References

External links
John Steckley, at Humber School for Writers Literary Agency
Biography and book description for Gibbons: The Invisible Apes

Living people
Last known speakers of a Native American language
Linguists of Iroquoian languages
Linguists from Canada
20th-century linguists
21st-century linguists
University of Toronto alumni
Academic staff of Humber College
1949 births